"Rock the Casbah" is a song by the English punk rock band the Clash, released in 1982 as the second single from their fifth album, Combat Rock. It reached number eight on the Billboard Hot 100 chart in the US (their only top 10 single in that country) and, along with the track "Mustapha Dance", it also reached number eight on the dance chart.

Recording
"Rock the Casbah" was composed by the band's drummer Topper Headon, based on a piano part that he had been toying with. Finding himself in the studio without his three bandmates, Headon progressively taped the drum, piano and bass parts, recording the bulk of the song's musical instrumentation himself.

This origin makes "Rock the Casbah" different from the majority of Clash songs, which tended to originate with music written by the Joe Strummer–Mick Jones songwriting partnership. Upon entering the studio to hear Headon's recording, the other Clash members were impressed with his creation, stating that they felt the musical track was essentially complete. From this point, relatively minor overdubs were added, such as guitars and percussion.

However, Strummer was not impressed by the page of suggested lyrics that Headon gave him. According to Clash guitar technician Digby Cleaver, they were "a soppy set of lyrics about how much he missed his girlfriend". "Strummer just took one look at these words and said, 'How incredibly interesting!', screwed the piece of paper into a ball and chucked it backwards over his head."

Strummer had been developing a set of lyrical ideas that he was looking to match with an appropriate tune. Before hearing Headon's music, Strummer had already come up with the phrases "rock the casbah" and "you'll have to let that raga drop", as lyrical ideas that he was considering for future songs. After hearing Headon's music, Strummer went into the studio's toilets and wrote lyrics to match the song's melody.

The version of the song on Combat Rock, as well as many other Clash compilations, features an electronic sound effect beginning at the 1:52-minute point of the song. This noise is a monophonic version of the song "Dixie". The sound effect source was generated by the alarm from a digital wristwatch that Mick Jones owned, and was intentionally added to the recording by Jones.

Lyrics
Joe Strummer had been toying with the phrase "rock the casbah" prior to hearing Topper Headon's musical track that would form the basis of the song. This phrase had originated during a jam session with Strummer's violinist friend Tymon Dogg. Dogg began playing Eastern scales with his violin and Strummer started shouting "rock the casbah!" Not hearing Strummer properly, Dogg thought that Strummer had been shouting at him to "stop, you cadger!"

Further inspiration for the lyrics of "Rock the Casbah" originated from Strummer observing the band's manager Bernie Rhodes moaning about The Clash's increasing tendency to perform lengthy songs. Rhodes asked the band facetiously "does everything have to be as long as this rāga?" (referring to the Indian musical style known for its length and complexity). Strummer later returned to his room at the Iroquois Hotel in New York City and wrote the opening lines to the song: "The King told the boogie-men 'you have to let that rāga drop.'"

The song gives a fabulist account of a ban on Western rock music by a Middle Eastern king. The lyrics describe the king's efforts to enforce and justify the ban, and the populace's protests against it by holding rock concerts in temples and squares ("rocking the casbah"). This culminates in the king ordering his military's fighter jets to bomb the protestors; however, after taking off, the pilots ignore his orders and instead play rock music on their cockpit radios, joining the protest and implying the loss of the king's power.

The events depicted in the song are similar to an actual ban on Western music, including rock music, enforced in Iran since the Iranian Revolution. Though classical music and public concerts were briefly permitted in the 1980s and 1990s, the ban was reinstated in 2005, and has remained in force ever since. Western music is still distributed in Iran through black markets, and Iranian rock music artists are forced to record in secret, under threat of arrest.

The song's lyrics feature various Arabic, Hebrew, Turkish, and Sanskrit loan-words, such as "sharif", "bedouin", "sheikh", "kosher", "rāga", "muezzin", "minaret", and "casbah".

Single
The single version has more pronounced bass. Also when Joe Strummer screams "The crowd caught a whiff / Of that crazy casbah jive" at the end of the third verse the word "jive" is sustained for several seconds with digital delay. Additionally, the sound effects of the jet fighters in the last verse are lower in the mix, particularly just after "drop your bombs between the minarets." The single version of the song is what is played in the music video. "Mustapha Dance", which features in many releases of the single, is an instrumental remix of the song.

Single issues
The single has several issues, all with different cover, format and B-side (see the table below).

Music video
The music video for "Rock the Casbah" was filmed in Austin, Texas by director Don Letts on 8 and 9 June 1982. It intermixes footage of the Clash (with Terry Chimes on the drums) miming a performance of the song, with a storyline depicting two characters travelling together throughout Texas. The video depicts a Muslim hitchhiker (played by actor Titos Menchaca) and a Hasidic Jewish limo driver (Dennis Razze) befriending each other on the road and skanking together through the streets to a Clash concert at Austin's City Coliseum. Throughout the video, an armadillo appears at points. At one point they are seen eating hamburgers in front of a Burger King restaurant. At another point, the Muslim character is seen drinking a beer; Letts stated that all that imagery was "about breaking taboos."

The Clash is shown miming a performance of the song in front of a pumpjack in a Texas oil field. For most of the video clip, guitarist Mick Jones's face is obscured by a veiled camouflage hat. The reason for this is that Jones was in a bad mood during the film shoot. Jones' face remains hidden until the final 30 seconds of the clip, when Strummer pulls the hat off at the "he thinks it's not kosher!" line.

Legacy
The song was chosen by Armed Forces Radio to be the first song broadcast on the service covering the area during Operation Desert Storm. In one of the campfire scenes late in the 2007 documentary Joe Strummer: The Future Is Unwritten, a friend states that Strummer wept when he heard that the phrase "Rock the Casbah" was written on an American bomb that was to be detonated on Iraq during the 1991 Gulf War.

Following the terrorist attacks on 11 September 2001, the song was placed on the list of post-9/11 inappropriate titles distributed by Clear Channel. In 2006, the conservative National Review released their list of the top 50 "Conservative Rock Songs", with "Rock the Casbah" at number 20, noting the Clear Channel list as well as frequent requests to the British Forces Broadcasting Service during the Iraq War. Cultural reviewer and political analyst Charlie Pierce commented that "the notion of the Clash as spokesfolk for adventurism in the Middle East might have been enough to bring Joe Strummer back from the dead."

Vulture writer Bill Wyman in 2017 ranked the song number ten of all the band's 139 songs, calling it "one of the greatest rock singles of all time." Wyman further wrote, "Like other Clash songs, this song requires some historical context" about Iran, starting from the 1953 coup d'état—which overthrew the democratically elected leader Mohammad Mosaddegh—to the Islamic Revolution of 1979, which resulted in overthrowing the rule of Mohammad Reza Pahlavi, king of the Imperial State of Iran, and the hostage crisis at the U.S. embassy in Tehran, rupturing their diplomatic relations—followed by Jimmy Carter, who was criticized for the way he handled the hostage crisis, losing the 1980 U.S. presidential election to Ronald Reagan.

Cover versions
Algerian rock singer Rachid Taha covered the song (in Algerian Arabic and the chorus in English) on his 2004 album Tékitoi. On 27 November 2005 at the Astoria, London, during the Stop the War Coalition Benefit Concert, "...for the night's grandstanding conclusion, the Clash legend Mick Jones strides on in a skinny black suit and plays probably the most exciting guitar he has delivered in years. He and the band are brilliant on Taha's definitive take on "Rock the Casbah", for which the audience goes berserk." They again played Taha's version of the song, "Rock el Casbah", in February 2006, at the France 4 TV show Taratatà. In 2007 at the Barbican, ".... The band were later joined by special guest Mick Jones from the Clash who performed on "Rock El Casbah" and then stayed on stage for the remainder of the show."

Charts

Weekly charts

Year-end charts

Certifications

Personnel
Joe Strummer – lead vocals, guitar
Mick Jones – guitar, backing vocals, sound effects
Paul Simonon – backing vocals, bass guitar
Topper Headon – drums, piano, bass guitar

References

Bibliography

External links
"A Brief History of 'Rock the Casbah'" City Pages (15 December 1999)

1982 songs
1982 singles
The Clash songs
Dance-punk songs
Macaronic songs
CBS Records singles
Columbia Records singles
Epic Records singles
Political songs
Works about the Middle East
Protest songs